The Ten of Spades' was a 1914 American silent short film directed by starring William Garwood, Victory Bateman, J.H. Horsey, William Lowery, Muriel Ostriche, C.E. Rogers, Vera Sisson, Josef Swickard, Metta White and Mabel Wright.

External links

American black-and-white films
American silent short films
1914 films
1910s American films